In mathematics, the Hardy–Littlewood circle method is a technique of analytic number theory. It is named for G. H. Hardy and J. E. Littlewood, who developed it in a series of papers on Waring's problem.

History
The initial idea is usually attributed to the work of Hardy with Srinivasa Ramanujan a few years earlier, in 1916 and 1917, on the asymptotics of the partition function. It was taken up by many other researchers, including Harold Davenport and I. M. Vinogradov, who modified the formulation slightly (moving from complex analysis to exponential sums), without changing the broad lines. Hundreds of papers followed, and  the method still yields results. The method is the subject of a monograph  by R. C. Vaughan.

Outline
The goal is to prove asymptotic behavior of a series: to show that  for some function. This is done by taking the generating function of the series, then computing the residues about zero (essentially the Fourier coefficients). Technically, the generating function is scaled to have radius of convergence 1, so it has singularities on the unit circle – thus one cannot take the contour integral over the unit circle.

The circle method is specifically how to compute these residues, by partitioning the circle into minor arcs (the bulk of the circle) and major arcs (small arcs containing the most significant singularities), and then bounding the behavior on the minor arcs. The key insight is that, in many cases of interest (such as theta functions), the singularities occur at the roots of unity, and the significance of the singularities is in the order of the Farey sequence. Thus one can investigate the most significant singularities, and, if fortunate, compute the integrals.

Setup 
The circle in question was initially the unit circle in the complex plane.

a power series generating function. The interesting cases are where  is then of radius of convergence equal to 1, and we suppose that the problem as posed has been modified to present this situation.

Residues 
From that formulation, it follows directly from the residue theorem that

We would like to take  directly, that is, to use the unit circle contour. In the complex analysis formulation this is problematic, since the values of  may not be defined there.

Singularities on unit circle 
The problem addressed by the circle method is to force the issue of taking , by a good understanding of the nature of the singularities f exhibits on the unit circle. The fundamental insight is the role played by the Farey sequence of rational numbers, or equivalently by the roots of unity:

Here the denominator , assuming that  is in lowest terms, turns out to determine the relative importance of the singular behaviour of typical  near .

Method 
The Hardy–Littlewood circle method, for the complex-analytic formulation, can then be thus expressed. The arcs make up the whole circle; the sum of the integrals over the major arcs is to make up  (realistically, this will happen up to a manageable remainder term).

Discussion 
Stated boldly like this, it is not at all clear that this can be made to work. The insights involved are quite deep. One clear source is the theory of theta functions.

Waring's problem 
In the context of Waring's problem, powers of theta functions are the generating functions for the sum of squares function. Their analytic behaviour is known in much more accurate detail than for the cubes, for example.

After that it is the fourth roots of unity  and  that matter most. While nothing in this guarantees that the analytical method will work, it does explain the rationale of using a Farey series-type criterion on roots of unity.

In the case of Waring's problem, one takes a sufficiently high power of the generating function to force the situation in which the singularities, organised into the so-called singular series, predominate. The less wasteful the estimates used on the rest, the finer the results. As Bryan Birch has put it, the method is inherently wasteful. That does not apply to the case of the partition function, which signalled the possibility that in a favourable situation the losses from estimates could be controlled.

Vinogradov trigonometric sums 
Later, I. M. Vinogradov extended the technique, replacing the exponential sum formulation f(z) with a finite Fourier series, so that the relevant integral  is a Fourier coefficient. Vinogradov applied finite sums to Waring's problem in 1926, and the general trigonometric sum method became known as "the circle method of Hardy, Littlewood and Ramanujan, in the form of Vinogradov's trigonometric sums".

Applications 
Refinements of the method have allowed results to be proved about the solutions of homogeneous Diophantine equations, as long as the number of variables  is large relative to the degree  (see Birch's theorem for example). This turns out to be a contribution to the Hasse principle, capable of yielding quantitative information.

Rademacher's contour

In the special case when the circle method is applied to find the coefficients of a modular form of negative weight, Hans Rademacher found a modification of the contour that makes the series arising from the circle method converge to the exact result. (The number  could be replaced by any number on the upper half-plane, but  is the most convenient choice.) Rademacher's contour is (more or less) given by the boundaries of all the Ford circles from 0 to 1, as shown in the diagram.

Notes

References

Further reading

External links 
Terence Tao, Heuristic limitations of the circle method, a blog post in 2012

Analytic number theory